The Offshore Reefs Archeological District is a U.S. historic district (designated as such on August 24, 1984) east of Homestead, Florida. It is located across a 30-mile stretch along the eastern edge of the Biscayne National Park.

References

External links
 Dade County listings at National Register of Historic Places
 Dade County listings at Florida's Office of Cultural and Historical Programs

Archaeological sites in Florida
Geography of Miami-Dade County, Florida
National Register of Historic Places in Miami-Dade County, Florida
Historic districts on the National Register of Historic Places in Florida
National Register of Historic Places in Biscayne National Park
1984 establishments in Florida